A drainage basin is an extent of land where water from rain and melting snow or ice drains downhill into a body of water, such as a river, lake, reservoir, estuary, wetland, sea or ocean. The drainage basin includes both the streams and rivers that convey the water as well as the land surfaces from which water drains into those channels, and is separated from adjacent basins by a drainage divide.

Major drainage basins are coded by hierarchy within the National Catchment Boundaries (NCB) dataset, with primary drainage basins attributed Level 1 and smaller river catchment subdivisions attributed Level 2. Beyond that, minor river and creek watersheds are ranked by the Pfafstetter Coding System. This article deals with surface water rather than groundwater basins, such as the Great Artesian Basin.

Australia has twelve distinguished NCB Level 1 drainage divisions or thirteen after splitting the South East Coast division at the New South Wales–Victoria border as defined by the Australian Water Resources Assessment 2012, a hydrological survey conducted by the Bureau of Meteorology. Runoff from these divisions generally flows into the Pacific Ocean, the Indian Ocean, the Southern Ocean and Lake Eyre.



List of NCB Level 1 drainage basins 

 A  New drainage basin codes assigned by the Bureau of Meteorology in 2010. Previous codes were labelled using Roman Numerals. See  for details.
 B  Long term average from July 1911 to June 2010
 C  The obsolete Australia River Basins 1997 survey listed the Bulloo-Bancannia drainage basin as a separate division, but has now been combined with the Lake Eyre Basin.
 D  Known in Queensland as Gulf Basin

List of NCB Level 2 drainage basins 

The following is a list of river or island catchments that are subdivisions of the basin containing them.

North East Coast  
 Jacky Jacky Creek
 Barron River
 Mulgrave-Russel Rivers
 Johnstone River
 Tully-Murray Rivers
 Cardwell Coast
 Hinchinbrook Island
 Herbert River
 Black River
 Ross River
 Haughton River
 Olive-Pascoe Rivers
 Burdekin River
 Don River
 Proserpine River
 Whitsunday Islands
 O'Connell River
 Pioneer River
 Plane Creek
 Styx River
 Shoalwater Creek
 Water Park Creek
 Lockhart River
 Fitzroy River (QLD)
 Curtis Island
 Calliope River
 Boyne River
 Baffle Creek
 Kolan River
 Burnett River
 Burrum River
 Mary River (QLD)
 Fraser Island
 Stewart River
 Noosa River
 Maroochy River
 Pine River
 Brisbane River
 Stradbroke Island
 Logan-Albert Rivers
 South Coast
 Normanby River
 Jeannie River
 Endeavour River
 Daintree River
 Mossman River

See also 

 List of reservoirs and dams in Australia
 List of rivers of Australia
 Geography of Australia
 Climate change in Australia
 Drought in Australia
 Great Artesian Basin

References

External links 
 Detailed drainage basins map
 Interactive drainage basins map and dataset

Australia

Drainage basins